Guinea competed in the 2007 All-Africa Games held at the Stade du 5 Juillet in the city of Algiers, Algeria. It was the fourth time that the country had competed in the games and the team left with three medals, including a silver for the national team in the men's football tournament.

Competitors
Guinea entered a wide range of athletics competitions, including the men's 100 metres, 200 metres, 400 metres (in both the men's and women's events), 1,500 metres, 5,000 metres, long jump. The country also competed in other events, including boxing, where Ibrahima Keita and Lamarana Conde made it to the quarter finals, the former winning to subsequently achieve a bronze medal.

Medal summary
Namibia won three medals, a silver and two bronze.

Medal table

List of Medalists

Silver Medal

Bronze Medal

See also
 Guinea at the African Games

References

2007 in Guinean sport
2007